Summit is a town in Muskogee County, Oklahoma, United States. It was originally called South Muskogee when it was platted in 1910, and is one of thirteen all-black towns still surviving at the beginning of the 21st Century. The population was 139 at the 2010 census, a 38.5 percent decline from the figure of 226 recorded in 2000.

Geography

Demographics

As of the census of 2000, there were 226 people, 66 households, and 54 families residing in the town. There were 73 housing units at an average density of 80.0 per square mile (31.0/km2). The racial makeup of the town was 84.07% African American, 5.75% White, 3.98% Asian, 1.33% Native American, 0.44% Pacific Islander, and 4.42% from two or more races. Hispanic or Latino of any race were 1.77% of the population.

There were 66 households, out of which 42.4% had children under the age of 18 living with them, 59.1% were married couples living together, 18.2% had a female householder with no husband present, and 16.7% were non-families. 15.2% of all households were made up of individuals, and 10.6% had someone living alone who was 65 years of age or older. The average household size was 3.42 and the average family size was 3.60.

In the town, the population was spread out, with 42.0% under the age of 18, 11.9% from 18 to 24, 18.1% from 25 to 44, 16.4% from 45 to 64, and 11.5% who were 65 years of age or older. The median age was 22 years. For every 100 females, there were 76.6 males. For every 100 females age 18 and over, there were 74.7 males.

The median income for a household in the town was $17,917, and the median income for a family was $15,625. Males had a median income of $16,563 versus $11,875 for females. The per capita income for the town was $6,390. About 34.5% of families and 47.5% of the population were below the poverty line, including 65.2% of those under the age of eighteen and 10.0% of those 65 or over.

Historic Sites
 
NRHP-listed sites in Summit include:
 W.E.B. DuBois School
 St. Thomas Primitive Baptist Church
Reverend L.W. Thomas Homestead

See also
 Boley, Brooksville, Clearview, Grayson, Langston, Lima, Redbird, Rentiesville, Taft, Tatums, Tullahassee, and Vernon, other "All-Black" settlements that were part of the Land Run of 1889.

References

Towns in Muskogee County, Oklahoma
Towns in Oklahoma
Populated places in Oklahoma established by African Americans
Pre-statehood history of Oklahoma